Route 820 is a  long mostly east–west secondary highway in the southwestern portion of New Brunswick, Canada.

Route description
Most of the route is in Kings County.

The route's eastern terminus is in Loch Lomond on the east bank of Loch Lomond, where it is known as Barnesville Rd. It travels in a northerly direction to Baxters Corner.  From here, the road travels mostly northeast to Second Lake, Third Lake, and Primrose. The route continues to Barnesville, crosses the Back River, and continues along the north bank to Upham. After passing Drummonds Lake, Route 820 ends in Upperton at Route 111.

History

See also

References

820
820